Wiener nougat is a type of nougat candy. Wiener nougat differs from French nougat by only including sugar, cocoa, cocoa mass and almond, whereas French nougat also includes egg white. Like other types of nougat candy in Finland, Wiener nougat is mostly sold at Christmas time.

Fazer Wiener nougat
Wiener nougat is one of the oldest classic candies of the Finnish confectionery company Fazer. Karl Fazer brought the recipe to Finland from his trip to Vienna, Austria in 1904. Production of the candy started in 1910.

Throughout the years, there have been several different kinds of packaging for Wiener nougat. The wrapper was originally silver-coloured, but in the 1970s it gained blue and yellow hues, and in the 2000s the candies were wrapped in a pale-coloured wrapper. Also the appearance of the candy boxes has varied.

In 2014 Fazer replaced the cocoa butter in the original recipe with cheaper palm oil.

References

Finnish confectionery
Fazer